The Western Pennsylvania Interscholastic Athletic League (WPIAL, pronounced ) is an interscholastic athletic association in Western Pennsylvania.  It is District 7 of the Pennsylvania Interscholastic Athletic Association.

History
The Western Pennsylvania Interscholastic Athletic League (WPIAL) was founded in 1907 by a group of educators from four public and private Pittsburgh schools who sought increased regulation and governance of student athletic eligibility and interscholastic athletic competition. The founding schools in the league included Shady Side Academy, Allegheny Prep, Pittsburgh Fifth Avenue High School, and Pittsburgh Central High School.  William R. Crabbe of Shady Side Academy acted as a central force in the formation of the League and served as its first president.

At its inception the league was poorly received by the public and the press, and found it difficult to enforce its rules. However, the league slowly spread throughout the Pittsburgh area. The league controlled the growth to small numbers that they could handle. As such, the only organization absorbed as a whole was the old Allegheny Valley League. Following the local success of WPIAL, the idea was brought to the whole state in 1914 when the Pennsylvania Interscholastic Athletic Association (PIAA) was founded. Within PIAA, WPIAL has been designated as District 7, and since 1982, WPIAL/District 7. Although officially known as District 7, the WPIAL is grandfathered to keep the older name due to it predating the PIAA.

Originally numbering three high schools, WPIAL had a high of 156 participating school as late as the 1981–82 school year. As of October 2012, there are 137 high schools and 148 junior high school members in the WPIAL.

Member schools
The league is responsible for administering the interscholastic athletic participation/competition of public school districts and private schools located in Allegheny (except Pittsburgh Public Schools), Armstrong, Beaver, Butler, Fayette, Greene, Lawrence, Washington, Westmoreland counties in Western Pennsylvania.

Exceptions as of the 2022-23 school year include:
Slippery Rock Area School District and Moniteau School District in Butler County participate in District 10 and District 9 respectively.
Wilmington Area School District in Lawrence and Mercer counties participates in District 10.
Since 2012, four high schools from Pittsburgh Public Schools in Allegheny County, which makes up PIAA District 8, compete in the WPIAL for baseball, softball, soccer, swimming, tennis, golf, and cross country.
Indiana Area School District, despite being located in Indiana County, which is part of District 6, competes in the WPIAL.

Sports
Note: While some sports are dominated by one sex, there is no rule that mandates sex segregation in PIAA sports, even if a school has teams for each sex.

Fall: Football, Golf, Tennis (girls), Cross Country, Volleyball (girls), Field Hockey, Soccer

Winter: Rifle, Gymnastics, Swimming & Diving, Wrestling, Basketball

Spring: Lacrosse (girls), Tennis (boys), Softball, Baseball, Volleyball (boys), Track & Field

Football champions, 2016–present 
2022
Class AAAAAA (6A): North Allegheny
Class AAAAA (5A): Pine-Richland
Class AAAA (4A): Aliquippa
Class AAA (3A): Belle Vernon
Class AA (2A): Steel Valley
Class A (1A): Union
2021
Class AAAAAA (6A): Mount Lebanon
Class AAAAA (5A): Penn-Trafford
Class AAAA (4A): Aliquippa
Class AAA (3A): Central Valley
Class AA (2A): Serra Catholic
Class A (1A): Bishop Canevin
2020
Class AAAAAA (6A): Central Catholic
Class AAAAA (5A): Pine-Richland
Class AAAA (4A): Thomas Jefferson
Class AAA (3A): Central Valley
Class AA (2A): Beaver Falls
Class A (1A): Jeannette
2019
Class AAAAAA (6A): Central Catholic
Class AAAAA (5A): Gateway
Class AAAA (4A): Thomas Jefferson
Class AAA (3A): Central Valley
Class AA (2A): Avonworth
Class A (1A): Clairton
2018
Class AAAAAA (6A): Pine-Richland
Class AAAAA (5A): Penn Hills
Class AAAA (4A): South Fayette
Class AAA (3A): Aliquippa
Class AA (2A): Steel Valley
Class A (1A): Our Lady of the Sacred Heart (OLSH)
2017
Class AAAAAA (6A): Pine-Richland 
Class AAAAA (5A): Gateway
Class AAAA (4A): Thomas Jefferson 
Class AAA (3A): Quaker Valley 
Class AA (2A): Washington 
Class A (1A): Jeannette 

2016
Class AAAAAA (6A): Central Catholic
Class AAAAA (5A): West Allegheny
Class AAAA (4A): Thomas Jefferson
Class AAA (3A): Beaver Falls 
Class AA (2A): Steel Valley
Class A (1A): Clairton

Boys' basketball champions, 2000–present 

Class AAAAAA (6A):

2022: New Castle 

2021: Upper St Clair 
2020: Butler 
2019: Mt. Lebanon 
2018: Penn Hills
2017: Pine Richland 

Class AAAAA (5A):
2021: New Castle 
2020: Laurel Highlands 
2019: Mars
2018: Mars
2017: Moon

Class AAAA (4A):
 2021: Lincoln Park 
 2020: Highlands 
 2019: New Castle 
 2018: New Castle 
 2017: New Castle
 2016: Pine-Richland
 2015: Mt. Lebanon 
 2014: Mt. Lebanon
 2013: New Castle
 2012: Gateway
 2011: Gateway
 2010: Mt. Lebanon
 2009: Peters Township
 2008: Pittsburgh Central Catholic
 2007: Bethel Park
 2006: Mt. Lebanon
 2005: Upper St. Clair
 2004: Mt. Lebanon 
 2003: Penn Hills
 2002: Mt. Lebanon
 2001: Chartiers Valley
 2000: Penn Hills

Class AAA (3A):
 2021: Ellwood City
 2020: North Catholic 
 2019: Lincoln Park
 2018: Lincoln Park
 2017: North Catholic
 2016: Beaver Falls
 2015: Indiana
 2014: Central Valley
 2013: Montour
 2012: New Castle
 2011: Montour
 2010: Chartiers Valley
 2009: Hampton Township
 2008: Blackhawk
 2007: West Allegheny
 2006: Moon
 2005: Moon
 2004: Moon
 2003: Blackhawk
 2002: Steel Valley
 2001: Brownsville
 2000: Blackhawk

Class AA (2A):
 2021 OLSH
 2020 OLSH
 2019 OLSH 
 2018 Sewickley Academy 
 2017: Sewickley Academy
 2016: Aliquippa
 2015: Aliquippa
 2014: Seton-LaSalle
 2013: Beaver Falls
 2012: Beaver Falls
 2011: Monessen
 2010: North Catholic
 2009: North Catholic
 2008: Jeannette
 2007: Aliquippa
 2006: Aliquippa
 2005: Beaver Falls
 2004: Aliquippa
 2003: Aliquippa
 2002: Sto-Rox
 2001: Sto-Rox
 2000: Aliquippa

Class A (1A):
 2021 Bishop Canevin 
 2020 Vincentian Academy 
 2019 Nazareth Prep
 2018: Vincentian Academy 
 2017: Monessen
 2016: North Catholic
 2015: Monessen
 2014: Lincoln Park
 2013: Vincentian Academy
 2012: Lincoln Park
 2011: Vincentian Academy
 2010: Sewickley Academy
 2009: Sewickley Academy
 2008: Serra Catholic
 2007: Leechburg
 2006: Clairton
 2005: Duquesne
 2004: Sewickley Academy
 2003: Union Township
 2002: Monessen
 2001: Monessen
 2000: Cornell

See also
 Chuck Heberling, long-time executive director of WPIAL

References

External links
 
 High School Football – WPIAL

Pennsylvania high school sports conferences
Pennsylvania Interscholastic Athletic Association
Sports in the Pittsburgh metropolitan area